Li Xian may refer to:
 Li Xian (Northern Zhou general) (502-569)
 Emperor Zhongzong of Tang (656–710), personal name Li Xian (李顯)
 Emperor Mozhu of Western Xia (r. 1226–1227), personal name Li Xian (李睍)
 Prince Zhanghuai (653–684), personal name Li Xian (李賢), Tang dynasty prince
 Li Chengqi (679–742), or Li Xian (李憲), Tang dynasty prince, son of Emperor Ruizong
 Li Xian (chancellor) (709–766; 李峴), Tang dynasty official
 Li Xian (Ming dynasty) (1408–1466; 李賢), Ming dynasty mandarin
 Li Xian (Xin dynasty) (李憲; died 30 AD), Xin dynasty general
 Li Xian (actor) (born 1991), Chinese actor

Places
Li County (disambiguation), also known as Li Xian